Nick de Bondt (born 21 April 1994) is a Dutch professional footballer who plays as a left winger for VV DUNO on loan from SV Spakenburg.

Career

Early career
Born and raised in Ede, Netherlands, de Bondt began his football career playing for the youth ranks of local amateur side SV Otterlo. In 2008, he joined the youth ranks of nearby Vitesse/AGOVV, the joint youth team of both Vitesse Arnhem and AGOVV Apeldoorn, where he remained for the next three seasons.

Ajax
On 8 June 2011, Ajax announced that they had signed the young left footed winger from Gelderland to a three-year contract, which bound him to the Amsterdam club until 30 June 2014. During his first season with Ajax, de Bondt joined the Ajax A1 youth selection. While playing for the Ajax A1 youth squad in 2011–12, de Bondt helped his side to win the Nike Eredivisie league title, as well as finishing as runners-up to Inter Milan in the NextGen Series (the Champions League equivalent for under-20 teams) after losing on penalties (5–3) following a 1–1 deadlock after extra time.

After playing for the Ajax A1 selection for his first two seasons with Ajax, de Bondt joined Ajax reserves' team Jong Ajax for the 2013–14 season. Jong Ajax had recently been promoted from the Beloften Eredivisie, and were now competing in the Dutch Eerste Divisie, the 2nd tier of professional football in the Netherlands. Having been sidelined due to an injury, de Bondt did not make his professional debut until matchday 11, where he substituted in for Boban Lazić in the 74' minute, in the 3–1 away loss to SBV Excelsior in Rotterdam.

Go Ahead Eagles
On 30 April 2014, Go Ahead Eagles announced that de Bondt would join the club from Deventer as a free transfer. De Bondt signed a two-year contract with an option for an additional year.

De Bondt left Go Ahead in summer 2016 for Tweede Divisie side De Treffers.

VV DUNO
On 31 January 2019, SV Spakenburg loaned out de Bondt to VV DUNO for the rest of the season.

International career
De Bondt made his debut playing for the Dutch national team on 8 February 2011 playing for the Netherlands U-17 in a friendly match against Greece U-17 which ended in a 1–0 win for the Dutch. He helped the Netherlands U-17 qualify for the 2011 UEFA European Under-17 Football Championship in Serbia, appearing in 1 match during the qualification process of the tournament which the Dutch were able to win defeating Germany U-17 5–2 in the final. De Bondt appeared in every match during the tournament to help his side secure the European Championship. On 10 September 2012, de Bondt made his debut for the Netherlands U-19 in a friendly match against Scotland U-19 which resulted in a 2–1 victory for the Netherlands. He scored his first goal for the Netherlands U-19 in a 2013 UEFA European Under-19 Championship qualification match against Poland U-19 at home. He then followed up by scoring his second goal for Netherlands U-19 in the same match, which ended in a 3–1 win for the Netherlands.

Career statistics

Club performance

1 Includes UEFA Champions League and UEFA Europa League matches.

2 Includes Johan Cruijff Shield and Play-off matches.

Honours

Club
Ajax A1 (under-19)
 Nike Eredivisie (1): 2011–12
 NextGen Series Runner-up: 2011–12

International
Netherlands under-17
 UEFA European Under-17 Championship (1): 2011

References

External links
 Voetbal International profile 
 
 
 

1994 births
Living people
People from Ede, Netherlands
Footballers from Gelderland
Association football wingers
Dutch footballers
Netherlands youth international footballers
Jong Ajax players
Go Ahead Eagles players
FC Dordrecht players
De Treffers players
Eerste Divisie players
Eredivisie players
Derde Divisie players